Michelle Courchesne (born May 6, 1953 in Trois-Rivières, Quebec) is a former Deputy Premier of Quebec. A member of the Quebec Liberal Party, she was the National Assembly Member for the riding of Fabre in Laval, Quebec. She is also the former President of the Treasury Board, Minister responsible for the Laval region, Minister of Education and Deputy Premier of Quebec. She is a former Minister of Family, Immigration, Employment and Social Solidarity.

Courchesne attended Collège Jean-de-Brébeuf before going to the Université de Montréal and obtained a bachelor's degree in sociology and a master's degree in urban development. She would become an urbanist from 1976 to 1981 before being elected to the City Council of Laval. She would also work at the Ministry of Culture and Communications as a Deputy Minister before being a member of the administration council of the National Bank of Canada, Radio-Canada, the National Theater School of Canada and the Quebec Mental Health Foundation. She was then the director of the Montreal Symphony Orchestra and a vice-president for Marketel and Cognicase.

Courchesne entered politics in 2003, where she was elected as the MNA for Fabre while the Liberals regained power after nine years of governing by the Parti Québécois. She was named by Jean Charest in the Cabinet as the Minister responsible for the relations with the Citizens and Immigration and was then promoted to Employment and Social Solidarity following a Cabinet shuffle in 2005 where she took the position occupied by Claude Béchard.

Following the 2007 elections, she was re-elected in a Liberal minority government, and named the Minister of Education, Leisure and Sports as well Minister of Family.

Following the 2008 election, she kept most of the portfolios but gave up the Ministry of Family to LaFontaine MNA Tony Tomassi. Courchesne lost the Education portfolio to former Environment Minister Line Beauchamp in a 2010 cabinet shuffle and became President of the Treasury Board. She regained the Education Minister position, as well as becoming Deputy Premier of Quebec, on May 14, 2012 following Beauchamp's resignation during the ongoing student protests over tuition hikes.

She retired at the 2012 election.

Electoral record

External links
 

1951 births
Living people
Members of the Executive Council of Quebec
Politicians from Laval, Quebec
People from Trois-Rivières
Quebec Liberal Party MNAs
Université de Montréal alumni
Women MNAs in Quebec
Deputy premiers of Quebec
21st-century Canadian politicians
21st-century Canadian women politicians
Women government ministers of Canada
National Bank of Canada people